John Beecher may refer to:

 Johnny Beecher (ice hockey) (born 2001), American ice hockey player
 John Beecher (poet) (1904–1980), American activist poet, writer, and journalist
 John Hubbard Beecher (1927–1987), American musician

See also
 John Beech (disambiguation)